Július Gombala (born 9 January 1993) is a Slovak footballer who plays as a right back or a defensive midfielder for ŠK Igram.

Career

Club career
Gombala made his professional Fortuna Liga's debut for FK Senica on 28 November 2014 against FC Spartak Trnava.

After a spell in Austria at SC Frauenkirchen, he returned to Slovakia in March 2020 and joined OZ TJ Družstevník Pavlice. In the summer 2021, he moved to ŠK Igram.

References

External links
 FK Senica profile
 
 Futbalnet profile
 Július Gombala at ÖFB

1993 births
Living people
Slovak footballers
Slovak expatriate footballers
Association football defenders
FK Železiarne Podbrezová players
TJ Baník Ružiná players
MFK Tatran Liptovský Mikuláš players
FK Senica players
FK Dukla Banská Bystrica players
TJ OFC Gabčíkovo players
FC Spartak Trnava players
Slovak Super Liga players
2. Liga (Slovakia) players
Slovak expatriate sportspeople in Austria
Expatriate footballers in Austria
Sportspeople from Banská Bystrica